Pierre Van Dormael (24 May 1952 – 3 September 2008) was a Belgian jazz guitarist and composer.

In 1988, he played in the James Baldwin Project with David Linx and Deborah Brown (vocalists), Slide Hampton (trombone), Diederik Wissels (piano), Bob Stewart (tuba), and Michel Hatzigeorgiou (bass guitar).

Van Dormael was also a member of Nasa Na Band, a jazz band known as the precursor of Aka Moon. He recorded soundtracks for films directed by his brother Jaco Van Dormael (Toto le Héros, Le Huitième Jour, Mr. Nobody).

In 2007, he received the Belgian Golden Django Award. Posthumously he received the Magritte Award for Best Original Score for his work in the movie Mr. Nobody.

He died from cancer at age 56 on 3 September 2008.

References
 Jazz in Belgium biography

External links
 
 
 

1952 births
2008 deaths
Belgian jazz musicians
Belgian film score composers
Male film score composers
Musicians from Brussels
Deaths from cancer in Belgium
Magritte Award winners
Male jazz musicians
Octurn members
20th-century Belgian male musicians